Mohamed Hashim Mohamed Kabir (Sinhala: කබීර් හෂීම්, Tamil: கபீர் ஹாசிம்; born 19 May 1959) popularly known as Kabir Hashim is a Sri Lankan politician and economist. He is a former member of the Parliament of Sri Lanka representing the Kegalle District and former Minister of Highways, Higher Education and Investment Promotion. Kabir was formerly the General Secretary of the United National Party.

Kabir was educated at Royal College Colombo and Trinity College Kandy. Kabir has obtained a Bachelor of Commerce degree with honors from the University of Peradeniya, Sri Lanka.

Political career 
Kabir was first elected as Member of Parliament in 2001 and had the highest preferential votes in the Kegalle District in 2004. He also served as Minister of Higher Education under former Prime Minister Ranil Wickremasinghe's Government from 2001 to 2004.

General Secretary of United National Party 
On 8 December 2014, Kabir was appointed as General Secretary of United National Party by Ranil Wickremasinghe, On the same day former General Secretary Tissa Attanayake defected to the Sri Lanka Freedom Party.

External links
Biographies of Member of Parliament
Right Royal rally of old Royalists in the Sri Lanka Parliament

References

United National Party politicians
Samagi Jana Balawegaya politicians
Sri Lankan economists
Alumni of Royal College, Colombo
Members of the 12th Parliament of Sri Lanka
Members of the 13th Parliament of Sri Lanka
Members of the 14th Parliament of Sri Lanka
Members of the 15th Parliament of Sri Lanka
Members of the 16th Parliament of Sri Lanka
1959 births
Living people
Alumni of Trinity College, Kandy
Sri Lankan Muslims
Transport ministers of Sri Lanka
Higher education ministers of Sri Lanka